Devon Park is a rural locality in the Toowoomba Region, Queensland, Australia.

History 
The locality is named after an early pastoral station in the district.

Devon Park Provisional School opened on 2 September 1903. On 1 January 1909, it became Devon Park State School. It closed in 1963.

References

Further reading 

  — includes Gowrie Little Plains School, Aubigny School, Crosshill School, Devon Park State School, Silverleigh State School, Boodua School, Greenwood State School, Kelvinhaugh State School

Toowoomba Region
Localities in Queensland